Penclawdd is a village in the north of the Gower Peninsula in the county of Swansea, Wales. Historically, it was part of Glamorgan. Penclawdd is most famous for its local cockle industry which goes back for many years to Roman times. It falls within the Penclawdd electoral ward. It is one of the larger villages on the Gower Peninsula.  Part of the village is perched on a high location, enjoying panoramic views over the Loughor estuary and surrounding Gower countryside, while the main part of the village stretches along the edge of the estuary. Being so close to an estuary, Penclawdd is thriving with wildlife. It is plentiful in birdlife and with wild horses that roam the estuary. The built-up area had a population of 1,935.

Brief history
Up until the end of the 19th century Penclawdd was a thriving sea port. The village was renowned for coal mining and its extensive tinplate, copper and brass works. There was a time when Penclawdd had a forge, twenty grocers, three butchers, three drapers, four fish and chip shops, eleven pubs, a cinema, the still remaining three chapels and a church and a busy railway station. The original railway platform still remains today. Also, built in 1807, a now derelict Hermon Chapel was used to help ships navigate the estuary.

Around 1800, John Vivian (1750–1826) of Truro, Cornwall, became managing partner in the copper works at Penclawdd and Loughor then owned by the Cheadle Brasswire Company of Staffordshire. The Vivian family eventually ran large copper mining, copper smelting and trading businesses in and around Swansea (Vivian & Sons) and, throughout the 19th century, did much to develop Swansea into a city.

Penclawdd RFC
Penclawdd RFC, nicknamed the Donks, have a long history in rugby union. Penclawdd RFC officially formed in 1888, but rugby has been played in the village since the 1880 / 1881 season, the same year as the founding of the Welsh Rugby Union.  In its formative years the club had no permanent pitch, but played on suitable available ground in various areas of the village. Haydn Tanner is one of the club's most famous players, playing for Wales and the British Lions in 1938. Willie Davies, another famous Penclawdd Welsh rugby union international went North and played rugby league for Bradford Northern in the 1930s and 1940s. He won the Lance Todd Trophy for the out standing player in the Challenge cup final at Wembley in 1947. He represented Great Britain at rugby league on the famous Indomitable's tour to Australia in 1946.

The club is still thriving today, recently celebrating 125 years of rugby being played at Penclawdd and the first team is currently competing in the Division 2 South West league of the WRU, the 2nds in the Swansea and district league, and the Youth play in the osprey rugby trust leagues.

Local delicacies

Penclawdd is famous for its cockle industry which has been a part of local life since at least the Roman period.

Cockles are collected from the extensive sandy flats in the Burry Estuary and the cockles harvested there are sold worldwide. Up until the 1970s, cockle gathering was a traditional female occupation with women using hand-rakes and riddles (coarse sieves) with the help of donkey carts.

The cockles were processed in small, family-owned factories. Although the Penclawdd factories have since been demolished, there are surviving units in the village of Crofty, especially on New Road. Today the harvesting is done mostly by men, often using tractors or Land Rovers and processed in two large, modern factories in Crofty.

Penclawdd cockles are often associated with Swansea Market, and a number of stalls within the market still sell the product. Today the product can be bought in shops and supermarkets throughout Wales but most are exported to continental Europe.

Other local delicacies include laverbread (laver seaweed Porphyra umbilicalis washed and boiled; it is eaten dipped in oatmeal and fried in bacon fat) and salt marsh lamb. All of these and more examples of Welsh cuisine are sold at an award-winning local Penclawdd produce market.

People
Composer Karl Jenkins was born and raised in Penclawdd.

Further reading
Several books have been published on the history of Penclawdd, including:

 A Dark And Pagan Place - By R. N. Cooper
 Higher And Lower - By R. N. Cooper 
 Estuary People - By Ann Roberts 
 Service With A Smile - By Ann Roberts

Notes

External links
Welcome to Penclawdd
Photos of Penclawdd and surrounding area on geograph
Penclawdd Primary School

Villages in Swansea
Populated places on the Gower Peninsula